Alajujeh (also Romanized as Alājūjeh; also known as Aladzhudzha, Ala Joojeh, and Alajuja) is a village in Minjavan-e Gharbi Rural District, Minjavan District, Khoda Afarin County, East Azerbaijan Province, Iran. At the 2006 census, its population was 222, in 44 families.

References 

Populated places in Khoda Afarin County